Tromsø is a city in Tromsø Municipality in Troms og Finnmark county, Norway.  The city is the administrative centre of the municipality as well as the administrative centre of Troms county.  The Diocese of Nord-Hålogaland and its Bishop are based at the Tromsø Cathedral in the city.  The city is located on the island of Tromsøya which sits in the Tromsøysundet strait, just off the mainland of Northern Norway.  The mainland suburb of Tromsdalen is connected to the city centre on Tromsøya by the Tromsø Bridge and the Tromsøysund Tunnel.  The suburb of Kvaløysletta on the island of Kvaløya is connected to the city centre by the Sandnessund Bridge.

The city centre (on Tromsøya) has a population of 38,980. The mainland borough of the city, Tromsdalen, has a population of 16,787 and the suburb of Kvaløysletta on the island of Kvaløya has a population of 8,681. The most populous town north of Tromsø in Norway is Alta, with a population of 15,094 (2017), making Tromsø a very large city for this vast rural northern part of Norway and the northernmost in the world with a population exceeding 20,000. It is the largest urban area in Northern Norway and the third largest north of the Arctic Circle anywhere in the world (following Murmansk and Norilsk).

The city's largest workplaces are the University of Tromsø (UiT) and University Hospital of North Norway. The Norwegian Polar Institute also has its headquarters in Tromsø. The Northern Lights Observatory was established in 1928, and two companies affiliated with the Kongsberg Gruppen collect satellite data from space using the observatory. The fishing industry is very important. Norway's Norges Råfisklag and Norges sjømatråd (seafood council) both have their headquarters in Tromsø. Sparebanken Nord-Norge also has its headquarters in the city. Furthermore, "Skatt nord", an agency of the Norwegian Tax Administration is based here too.

The city is warmer than most other places located on the same latitude, due to the warming effect of the Gulf Stream. Tromsø is even milder than places much farther south of it elsewhere in the world, such as on the Hudson Bay and in Far East Russia, with the warm-water current allowing for both relatively mild winters and tree growth in spite of its very high latitude.

The city centre of Tromsø contains the highest number of old wooden houses in Northern Norway, the oldest house dating from 1789. The city is a cultural centre for its region, with several festivals taking place in the summer. Torbjørn Brundtland and Svein Berge of the electronica duo Röyksopp and Lene Marlin grew up and started their careers in Tromsø. Noted electronic musician Geir Jenssen also hails from Tromsø.

Etymology
The city of Tromsø is named after the island of Tromsøya, on which it stands. The last element of the city's name comes from the word for "island" (Danish: ø), but the etymology of the first element is uncertain. Several theories exist. One theory holds "Troms-" to derive from the old (uncompounded) name of the island (Old Norse: Trums). Several islands and rivers in Norway have the name Tromsa, and the names of these are probably derived from the word straumr which means "(strong) current". (The original form must then have been Strums, for the missing s see Indo-European s-mobile.) Another theory holds that Tromsøya was originally called Lille Tromsøya (Little Tromsøya), because of its proximity to the much bigger island today called Kvaløya, that according to this theory was earlier called "Store Tromsøya" due to a characteristic mountain known as Tromma (the Drum). The mountain's name in Sámi, Rumbbučohkka, is identical in meaning, and it is said to have been a sacred mountain for the Sámi in pre-Christian times.

The Sámi name of the island, Romsa, is assumed to be a loan from Norse - but according to the phonetical rules of the Sami language the frontal t has disappeared from the name.  However, an alternative form - Tromsa - is in informal use. There is a theory that holds the Norwegian name of Tromsø derives from the Sámi name, though this theory lacks an explanation for the meaning of Romsa. A common misunderstanding is that Tromsø's Sámi name is Romssa with a double "s". This, however, is the accusative and genitive form of the noun used when, for example, writing "Tromsø Municipality" (Romssa Suohkan). In Finnish, however, the word is written with a double "s": Tromssa.

History
The area has been inhabited since the end of the ice age. Archeological excavations in Tønsvika, just outside the city limits, have turned up artifacts and remains of buildings estimated to be 9,000 to 10,000 years old.

Middle Ages: a fortress on the frontier

The area's rich Norse and Sámi heritage is well documented. The Norse chieftain Ohthere, who lived during the 890s, is assumed to have inhabited the southernmost reaches of today's Tromsø municipality. He described himself as living "furthest to the North of all Norwegians" with areas north of this being populated by Sámi. An Icelandic source (Rimbegla) from the 12th century also describes the fjord Malangen in the south of today's Tromsø municipality as a border between Norse and Sámi coastal settlements during that part of the Middle Ages. There has also been extensive Sámi settlement on the coast south of this 'border' as well as scattered Norse settlements north of Malangen—for example, both Sámi and Norse Iron Age (0–1050 AD) remains have been found on southern Kvaløya.

The first church on the island of Tromsøya was erected in 1252. Ecclesia Sanctae Mariae de Trums juxta paganos ("The Church of Saint Mary in Troms near the Heathens"—the eponymous "heathens" being the Sámi), was built during the reign of King Hákon Hákonarson. At the time, it was the northernmost church in the world. Around the same time a turf rampart was built to protect the area against raids from Karelia and Russia.

Tromsø was not just a Norwegian outpost in an area mainly populated by the Sámi, but also a frontier city towards Russia; the Novgorod state had the right to tax the Sámi along the coast to Lyngstuva and inland to the Skibotn River or possibly the Målselv River, whereas Norway was allowed to tax areas east to - and including - the Kola Peninsula. During the next five hundred years Norway's border with Russia and the limits of Norwegian settlement would be pushed eastwards to Sør-Varanger, making Tromsø lose its character as a "frontier town".

1700s and 1800s: the "Paris of the north"
During the 17th century, while Denmark–Norway was solidifying its claim to the northern coast of Scandinavia and during this period a redoubt, Skansen, was built. Despite only being home to around 80 people, Tromsø was declared a kjøpstad and issued its city charter in 1794 by King Christian VII. This coincided with, and was a direct consequence of, the abolition of the city of Bergen's centuries-old monopoly on the trade in cod. Tromsø quickly rose in importance. The Diocese of Hålogaland was created in 1804, with the first bishop being Mathias Bonsak Krogh. The city was established as Tromsø Municipality 1 January 1838 (see formannskapsdistrikt), but at that time it was a very small size in area.  Over time the municipality grew much larger in area by merging with neighboring areas (especially during the 1960s).

Arctic hunting, from Novaya Zemlya to Canada, started up around 1820. By 1850, Tromsø was the major centre of Arctic hunting, overtaking the former centre of Hammerfest, and the city was trading from Arkhangelsk to Bordeaux. 

In 1848, the teacher training college was also moved from Trondenes (near current-day Harstad) to Tromsø, with part of its mission being to educate Sámi scholars - there was a quota ensuring that Sámi gained access. The teacher college was followed by the Tromsø Museum in 1872, and the Mack Brewery in 1877.

During the 19th century, Tromsø became known as the "Paris of the North". How this nickname came into being is uncertain, but the reason is generally assumed to be that people in Tromsø appeared far more sophisticated than visitors from the south typically expected.

Early 1900s: exploration and war

By the end of the 19th century, Tromsø had become a major Arctic trade centre from which many Arctic expeditions originated. Explorers like Roald Amundsen, Umberto Nobile and Fridtjof Nansen made use of the know-how in Tromsø on the conditions in the Arctic, and often recruited their crews in the city.  The Northern lights observatory was founded in 1927.

When Germany invaded Norway in 1940, Tromsø served briefly as the seat of the Norwegian government. General Carl Gustav Fleischer arrived in Tromsø on 10 April 1940 after flying in terrible conditions. From Tromsø he issued orders for total civilian and military mobilisation and declared Northern Norway a theatre of war. Fleischer's strategic plan was to first wipe out the German forces at Narvik and then transfer his division to Nordland to meet a German advance from Trøndelag. The Germans eventually captured all of Norway, after allied support had been withdrawn, although they encountered fierce resistance from the Finnmark-based Alta Battalion at Narvik. Tromsø escaped the war unscathed, although the German battleship Tirpitz was sunk by the RAF off the Tromsøy island on 12 November 1944, killing close to 1,000 German sailors.

At the end of the war, the city received thousands of refugees from Finnmark county and the northern areas of Troms - areas which had been devastated by German forces using scorched earth tactics in expectation of a Red Army offensive.

Municipal history
The city of Tromsø was established as an independent municipality on 1 January 1838 (see formannskapsdistrikt). The city was completely surrounded by the Tromsøe landdistrikt (the rural municipality of Tromsø / later renamed Tromsøysund), but they were governed separately. As the city grew in size, areas were added to the city from the rural district.

On 1 January 1861, an area of Tromsøysund (population: 110) was transferred to the city of Tromsø. On 1 January 1873, an unpopulated area of Tromsøysund was transferred to the city. On 1 July 1915, another area of Tromsøysund (population: 512) was merged into the city of Tromsø. On 1 January 1955, the Bjerkaker area on Tromsøya (population: 1,583) was transferred from Tromsøysund to the city of Tromsø.

During the 1960s, there were many municipal mergers across Norway due to the work of the Schei Committee. On 1 January 1964, the city of Tromsø (population: 12,602), the municipality of Tromsøysund (population: 16,727), most of the municipality of Ullsfjord except for the Svendsby area (population: 2,019), and most of the municipality of Hillesøy except for the parts on the island of Senja (population: 1,316) were all merged to form a new, larger Tromsø Municipality.

Climate
The Climate is a Subarctic climate (Köppen: Dfc)

Light and darkness
The midnight sun occurs from about 18 May to 26 July, but the mountains in the north block the view of it for a few days, meaning that one can see the midnight sun from about 21 May to 21 July. Owing to Tromsø's high latitude, twilight is long, meaning there is no real darkness between late April and mid-August.

The sun remains below the horizon during the polar night from about 26 November to 15 January, but owing to the mountains, the sun is not visible from 21 November to 21 January. The return of the sun is an occasion for celebration. However, because of the twilight, there is some daylight for a couple of hours even around midwinter, often with bluish light. The nights shorten quickly. By 21 February the sun is above the horizon from 7:45 am to 4:10 pm, and by 1 April it is above the horizon from 5:50 am to 7:50 pm (daylight saving time). If we include astronomical twilight as "not night", then Tromso only has 14 hours of night on the winter solstice.

The combination of snow cover and sunshine often creates intense light conditions from late February until the snow melts in the lowland (usually late April), and sunglasses are essential when skiing. Because of these diametrically different light conditions in winter, Norwegians often divide it into two seasons: Mørketid (polar night) and Seinvinter (late winter).

It is possible to observe aurora borealis (northern lights) from Tromsø, as northern Norway is located in the auroral zone. As it is always light in the summer, no aurora is visible between late April and mid August. Additionally, due to the coastal location, Tromsø is often subject to cloudy conditions which prevents aurora being seen, even if they are present.

Cityscape 
The compact city centre has the biggest concentration of historic wooden houses north of the city of Trondheim, and they co-exist with modern architecture. The houses date from 1789 to 1904, when building wooden houses was banned in the city centre, as in several other Norwegian cities. The oldest house in Tromsø is Skansen, built in 1789 on the remains of a 13th-century turf rampart.

The Polar Museum, Polarmuseet, situated in a wharf house from 1837, presents Tromsø's past as a centre for Arctic hunting and starting point for Arctic expeditions. Tromsø Cathedral, Norway's only wooden cathedral, built in 1861, is located in the middle of the city, and so is the small Catholic church Vår Frue ("Our Lady"). Northern Europe's oldest cinema still in use, Verdensteatret, was built in 1915–16. The cinema has large wall paintings, made by the local artist Sverre Mack in 1921, which picture scenes from Norwegian folk lore and fairy tales.

The Arctic Cathedral, a modern church built in 1965, is situated on the mainland, facing the sound and city centre. The church, in reality a parish church and not a cathedral, was drawn by Jan Inge Hovig. The Polaria aquarium and experience centre from 1998 is a short walk south from the city centre. The Tromsø Museum is a university museum, presenting culture and nature of North Norway. The museum also displays the Arctic-alpine botanic garden, the world's northernmost botanical garden. The mountain Tromsdalstinden, on the mainland, which is easily spotted from the city centre, is also a major landmark. At the top of Tromsøya is a lake called Prestvannet.

Transport 
The public transport service in Tromsø is dominated by bus. Most visitors arrive into the city by air. A private airport shuttle named the Airport Express Coach runs from the airport to the city centre in around 15 minutes. An alternative option is to use the local bus routes 40 and 42, which stop just a few minutes walk from the terminal, and are considerably cheaper. There is also a taxi rank outside the airport terminal as well as several taxi ranks in downtown Tromsø. The taxi fare from the airport to the city centre during the daytime on weekdays is approximately NOK 200. Buses run from early morning to late night Mon-Fri, with a less frequent service at weekends. There is also a night bus service on Friday and Saturday nights from the city centre to select parts of the city suburbs. District buses run within the municipality of Tromsø and depart from Prostneset, the main bus station in Tromsø, which is located beside the main Tourist Information Office.

Sports

Tromsø is the home of many football clubs, of which the three most prominent are Tromsø IL, which plays in the Norwegian Premier League and is the world's northernmost Premier League football team, I.F. Fløya in the Norwegian First Division (women), and Tromsdalen U.I.L., playing in the Adeccoliga. Tromsø Midnight Sun Marathon is arranged every year in June and recently also a Polar Night Halfmarathon in January. The city is home to many clubs in the top division in various sports. Most notably basketball-outfit Tromsø Storm in the BLNO, BK Tromsø in the top volleyball league for men, and Tromsø Volley in the top volleyball league for women. The oldest sports club in Tromsø is Tromsø Turnforening, a gymnastics club founded in 1862, that also was the cradle of the before mentioned football club Tromsø IL.

Tromsø was selected by the Norwegian National Olympic Committee as Norway's candidate for the 2018 Winter Olympics. This would have made Tromsø the first city north of the Arctic Circle to host the games. There were plans to use ships as the media village. In October 2008 the NOC suspended Tromsø's bid, citing excessive costs. From the southern to the northern tip of the island Tromsøya, there is a floodlit cross country ski track. A ski jump is also situated on the island, close to the university. As of the spring in 2010, the city's first ice rink has been open and is home to Tromsø Hockey, which plays in the Swedish Ice Hockey Association's League 3.

See also
List of towns and cities in Norway

References

Cities and towns in Norway
Tromsø
1794 establishments in Norway
Populated coastal places in Norway
Populated places of Arctic Norway
Port cities and towns in Norway